Samir Ranjan Barman is an Indian politician. He was the Chief Minister of Tripura in India from 19 February 1992 to 10 March 1993 as a member of the Indian National Congress. He is the father of the current legislator from Agartala Constituency and Indian National Congress leader Sudip Roy Barman. He has contested from Bishalgarh constituency in the Assembly elections from 1972 to 2013 in 9 elections consecutively, winning in 1972, 1988, 1993, 1998 and 2003 elections. He was the leader of opposition in the Tripura Legislative Assembly from 1993 to 1998. He is also the former president of Tripura Pradesh Congress Committee.

References

Living people
1940 births
Tripura politicians
Chief Ministers of Tripura
Bengali politicians
Chief ministers from Indian National Congress
Indian National Congress politicians
Janata Party politicians
Tripura MLAs 1972–1977
Tripura MLAs 1988–1993
Tripura MLAs 1993–1998
Tripura MLAs 1998–2003
Tripura MLAs 2003–2008